Truva Paten Spor Kulübü, aka Ankara Truva, is a Turkish ice hockey club based in Ankara, Turkey. Founded in 2005, the club's men's team play in the Turkish Ice Hockey Super League (TBHSL) and the women's team in the Turkish Ice Hockey Women's League (TBHBL). The club with the colors yellow, white and black play their home matches at the Ankara ice skating palace.

Achievements
 2011–12 TBHSL season Group A 3rd
 2012–13 TBHSL season 5th

Men's team roster (2012-13)

References

External links
Turkish Ice Hockey Federation official site

Sports teams in Ankara
Ice hockey clubs established in 2005
Turkish Ice Hockey Super League teams
2005 establishments in Turkey
Ice hockey teams in Turkey
Turkish Ice Hockey Women's League teams